Reima Untamo Salonen (born November 19, 1955 in Taivassalo, Southwest Finland) is a retired race walker from Finland, known for winning the gold medal in the men's 50 km Walk event at the 1982 European Championships in Athens, Greece. A former world record holder, he represented his native country in three Summer Olympics (1980, 1984 and 1988).

He was the bronze medallist at the 1976 World Championships in Athletics – a one-off 50 km walk competition to compensate for the dropping of the event at the 1976 Summer Olympics.

Achievements

References

External links

1955 births
Living people
People from Taivassalo
Finnish male racewalkers
Athletes (track and field) at the 1980 Summer Olympics
Athletes (track and field) at the 1984 Summer Olympics
Athletes (track and field) at the 1988 Summer Olympics
Olympic athletes of Finland
World record setters in athletics (track and field)
World Athletics Championships medalists
European Athletics Championships medalists
Sportspeople from Southwest Finland